Sporosalibacterium faouarense is a Gram-positive, strictly anaerobic, spore-forming, moderately halophilic, mesophilic and motile bacterium from the genus of Sporosalibacterium which has been isolated from soil which was contaminated with hydrocarbons from Tunisia.

References

Clostridiaceae
Bacteria described in 2011
Bacillota